The Bordello is a 1971 West German drama film directed by Alfred Weidenmann and starring Karin Jacobsen, Herbert Fleischmann and Gisela Peltzer.

Cast
 Karin Jacobsen as Rosi
 Herbert Fleischmann as Leopold
 Gisela Peltzer as Frau Silberstein
 Gisela Trowe as Prostitute
 Paul Edwin Roth as Herr Silberstein
 Friedrich G. Beckhaus as Baumann
 Wolfgang Stumpf as Von Weber
 Monica Kaufmann as Wally
 Astrid Frank as Inge
 Ingrid Bucksetter as Sonja
 Eva Gelb as Dodo
 Christiane Maybach as Tilly
 Michael Büttner as Michael
 Mathias Einert as Egon
 Georg M. Fischer as Jonathan
 Wolfgang Giese as Siegfried
 Hans Hessling as Chess Player
 Manfred Reddemann as Karl
 Ernst-Günter Seibt as Willi
 Gerda Gmelin as Mutter Oberin
 Peter Ahrweiler

References

Bibliography
 Goble, Alan. The Complete Index to Literary Sources in Film. Walter de Gruyter, 1999.

External links 
 

1971 films
1971 drama films
German drama films
West German films
1970s German-language films
Films directed by Alfred Weidenmann
Films based on German novels
Films about prostitution in Germany
1970s German films